Ngawang Rinchen (born 26 February 1984) is a Chinese actor of Tibetan descent.

Early life and education
Ngawang Rinchen was born in Lhasa, Tibet, China. He graduated from Shanghai Theatre Academy in 2007, where he majored in acting. After graduation, he was assigned to Tibetan Drama Troupe.

Career
Ngawang Rinchen had his first experience in front of the camera in 2013, and he was chosen to act as a support actor in The Untold Story of Tibet, a historical television series starring Guo Xiaodon, Shen Aojun and Cao Bingkun. That same year, he made his film debut in A Doctor, A General, playing Peng Cuo.

In 2014, he starred in Phurbu & Tenzin, a historical television series directed by Fu Dongyu and written by A Lai. For his role as Danzeng, he won the Newcomer Award at the 15th Golden Phoenix Awards, the Best Newcomer Award at the 23rd Shanghai Film Critics Association, and the Newcomer Award at the 15th Huabiao Awards. At the same year, he co-starred with Jiang Shuying and Chen Jin in A Noble Spirit.

Filmography

Film

Television series

References

External links

 Ngawang Rinchen Douban 
 

1984 births
People from Lhasa
Living people
21st-century Chinese male actors
Shanghai Theatre Academy alumni
Tibetan male actors
Chinese male film actors
Chinese male television actors